Sassari Cathedral (Cattedrale di San Nicola) is the Roman Catholic cathedral of Sassari, Sardinia, Italy, and is dedicated to Saint Nicholas. It is the seat of the Archbishop of Sassari. It was  built in the Romanesque style in the 12th century. The present building also includes Gothic, Renaissance, Baroque and Neoclassical elements. Construction was finished in the 18th century.

Sources
 Luoghi-Sacra.it: La Cattedrale di San Nicola a Sassari, il Duomo di Sassari in Sardegna

Bibliography

 Roberto Coroneo. Architettura Romanica dalla metà del Mille al primo '300. Nuoro, Ilisso, 1993. 
 Francesca Segni Pulvirenti, Aldo Sari. Architettura tardogotica e d'influsso rinascimentale. Nuoro, Ilisso, 1994. 
 Salvatore Naitza. Architettura dal tardo '600 al classicismo purista. Nuoro, Ilisso, 1992. 
 Maria Grazia Scano. Pittura e scultura dell'Ottocento. Nuoro, Ilisso, 1997. 

12th-century Roman Catholic church buildings in Italy
Churches in the province of Sassari
Roman Catholic cathedrals in Italy
Cathedrals in Sardinia
Romanesque architecture in Sardinia
Gothic architecture in Sardinia
Baroque architecture in Sardinia
Neoclassical church buildings in Italy